The Battle of Fangtou took place in the fourth year of Taihe in the Eastern Jin Dynasty (369), and was a decisive battle in Huan Wen's third Northern Expedition.

Background
On Gengxu Day in April of the fourth year of Taihe (May 22, 369), Huan Wen led an army of 50,000 troops from Gushu (now Dangtu County, Anhui) to the north on an expedition, and led a water army to enter the Yellow River from Qingshui. Former Emperor Murong Wei of Yan followed Huan Wen to fight against Huan Wen under Prince of Pi Murong Li, but was defeated in Huangxu. Murong Wei led an army led by Prince of Le'an Murong Zang to resist, but he was still unable to win. General Fu Yanyi of Yan was defeated at Linzhu by Jin army forwards Deng Xia and Zhu Xu, and the morale of the Jin army was greatly boosted, but Former Yan had no choice but to send envoys to ask for help from Former Qin.

Course
In July, Huan Wen stationed troops at Fangtou. At that time, Sun Yuan, the former Yanzhou governor of Yanzhou, also raised troops to respond to Huan Wen. Murong Wei and Taifu Murong Ping were very afraid when they saw the Jin army approaching, and planned to flee to Helong. However, Murong Chui, Prince of Wu, asked himself to fight. Murong Wei then took Murong Chui as the governor of the Southern Expedition, and led Murong De and others to lead 50,000 troops to resist the Jin army. Huan Wen appointed Duan Si, a native of Yan who had surrendered, as his guide at that time. Yan general Xi Luoteng fought with the Jin army and successfully captured Duan Si alive. Soon Jin general Li Shu's attack was also defeated by Xi Luoteng and Ranganjin. Even more died in battle. After these two defeats, the morale of the Jin army became low.

On the other hand, Murong De and Liu Dang respectively led 10,000 and 5,000 cavalry troops out of Tuen Shimen in September, preventing the Jin general Yuan Zhen from opening the Shimen Waterway to transport grain. Set up an ambush to lure the Jin army to pursue and defeat the opponent; Li Yu, the governor of Yanyu Prefecture, also led five thousand troops to break Huan Wen liang Road. However, Former Yan asked for help from Qin Dynasty on the condition of the land west of Hulao. Wang Meng advised Fu Jian to temporarily save Former Yan from being annexed by the Eastern Jin Dynasty, and to take advantage of the weakening of Former Yan's national power after the war before sending troops to annex it. Fu Jian, the king of Former Qin, obeyed and ordered Gouchi and Deng Qiang, the governor of Luozhou, to send troops to rescue.

Huan Wen was defeated in the battle, and at that time there was also a lack of food. Knowing that the former Qin sent troops to assist Yan, they burned the ships on Bingshen Day in September, abandoned their supplies and weapons, and withdrew their troops by land. Huan Wen withdrew from Dongyan County to Cangyuan (now northeast of Kaifeng, Henan). In order to prevent the former Yan army from poisoning the Bian River and other rivers, he ordered wells to be dug for drinking water, and walked more than 700 miles. At that time, all the generals of the Yan army wanted to pursue them, but Murong Chui believed that the Jin army would be on strict guard when they first retreated. Lead eight thousand horses and follow the Jin army. Afterwards, the Jin army accelerated as Murong Chui predicted. A few days later, Murong Chui ordered a pursuit, and pursued the Jin army in Xiangyi (now west of Sui County, Henan). At that time, Murong De had already led 4,000 cavalry to set up an ambush in Dongjian, Xiangyi, and finally joined Murong Chui in a pincer attack on the Jin army. Huan Wen was defeated and more than 30,000 people died. The reinforcements from the former Qin Dynasty also invited the defeated Huan Wen army in Qiao County (now Bozhou, Anhui), and tens of thousands of Jin troops died in the battle. On Jisi Day in October (December 7), Huan Wen packed up the scattered soldiers and stationed them in Shanyang (now Huai'an, Jiangsu). Sun Yuan, who originally responded to Huan Wen, was also pacified by Qian Yan.

Aftermath
The defeat of the Jin army in this battle also represented the failure of Huan Wen's third Northern Expedition. After Huan Wen's defeat, his reputation and strength declined greatly, and he was no longer able to accept Jiuxi and usurp the throne on his own according to the original plan. As a result, two years later, Huan Wen deposed the Jin Emperor and replaced him with the Jin Jianwen Emperor.
Murong Chui led the Yan army to repel the Jin army in the Battle of Fangtou, and became famous. However, Murong Ping, who had always been suspicious of his tutor, was disgusted. Qin.
When Qianyan asked Qianqin for help, he promised to use the land west of Hulao as a condition, but after the war Qianyan repented and refused to give it.

References

Conflicts in 369
zh:枋頭之戰
Former Yan
Former Qin
Jin dynasty (266–420)